Ni tú ni yo is a 2018 Mexican comedy film directed by Noé Santillán-López. The film is written and starring César Rodríguez and Mauricio Argüelles, along with Bárbara de Regil, Alfonso Herrera, and Rocío Verdejo. The story revolves around Guadalupe Martínez best known in the world of wrestling as "El Halcón Negro", a young Mexican considered by many as the best fighter in his branch, and Gabino better known as "El Conejo", both are two brothers who have been separated for many years because of Gabino's additions, but together they will rejoin to prevent Guadalupe from losing her recognition as the best fighter. It premiered on 12 October 2018 in Mexico.

Cast 
 César Rodríguez as Gabino "El Conejo"
 Mauricio Argüelles as Guadalupe Martínez "El Halcón Negro"
 Bárbara de Regil as Miranda
 Alfonso Herrera as himself
 Arnulfo Reyes Sánchez as Malandro
 Alejandro Calva as Don Archibaldo
 Rocío Verdejo as Mónica
 José Sefami as Joaquín
 Fabiola Guajardo as Actress
Ana paula Martínez as Giovanna

References

External links 
 

Mexican comedy films
2010s Mexican films